The 2022 Monaco FIA Formula 2 round was a motor racing event held between 27 and 29 May 2022 at the Circuit de Monaco in Monte Carlo, Monaco. It was the fifth round of the 2022 FIA Formula 2 Championship, and was held in support of the 2022 Monaco Grand Prix.

Classification

Qualifying
Liam Lawson originally finished first in qualifying, but was later stripped of pole position and given a five-place grid-penalty in the Sprint Race due to failing to slow under yellow flags. Felipe Drugovich therefore inherited the pole position, his second of the season.

Group A

Group B

Notes
 – Ralph Boschung originally qualified eleventh for both Sprint Race and Feature Race, but later withdrew from the event due to long-lasting neck problems. Thus, all drivers behind him advanced one place each at the starting grid.
 – Richard Verschoor was not able to set a time within 107% due to technical problems, but was later given permission to start both Sprint Race and the Feature Race from the back of the grid.

Sprint race 

Notes:
 – Liam Lawson and Ayumu Iwasa both received a five-place and ten-place grid-penalty respectively for failing to slow under yellow flags.
 – Olli Caldwell received a three-place grid drop for impeding Marino Sato in Qualifying.

Feature race 

Notes:
 – Calan Williams and Ayumu Iwasa collided on the final lap, but were classified as they completed more than 90% of the race distance.

Standings after the event 

Drivers' Championship standings

Teams' Championship standings

 Note: Only the top five positions are included for both sets of standings.

See also 
 2022 Monaco Grand Prix

References

External links 
 Official website

|- style="text-align:center"
|width="35%"|Previous race:
|width="30%"|FIA Formula 2 Championship2022 season
|width="40%"|Next race:

Monaco
Formula 2
Formula 2